Campbell Island / Motu Ihupuku is an uninhabited subantarctic island of New Zealand, and the main island of the Campbell Island group. A long fiord, Perseverance Harbour, nearly bisects it, opening out to sea on the east coast.

The island is listed with the New Zealand Outlying Islands. The island is an immediate part of New Zealand, but not part of any region or district, but instead Area Outside Territorial Authority, like all other outlying islands, other than the Solander Islands. It is the closest piece of land to the antipodal point of the United Kingdom, and Ireland, meaning that the furthest away city is Limerick, Ireland.

Campbell Island is a UNESCO World Heritage Site.

History
 
Campbell Island was discovered in 1810 by Captain Frederick Hasselborough of the sealing brig Perseverance, which was owned by shipowner Robert Campbell's Sydney-based company Campbell & Co. (whence the island's name). Captain Hasselborough drowned on 4 November 1810 in Perseverance Harbour on the south of the island, along with a young woman and a boy.

The island became a seal hunting base, and the seal population was almost totally eradicated.  The first sealing boom was over by the mid-1810s. The second was a brief revival in the 1820s. The sealing era lasted from 1810 till 1912 during which time 49 vessels are recorded visiting for sealing purposes, one of which was lost off the coast.

The whaling boom extended here in the 1830s and '40s. In 1874, the island was visited by a French scientific expedition intending to view the transit of Venus. Much of the island's topography is named after aspects of, or people connected with, the expedition.

In December 1840 Campbell Island was the last landfall before the Ross expedition explored the Antarctic.

In 1883 the American schooner Sarah W. Hunt, a whaler, was near Campbell Island. Twelve men in two small whaleboats headed for the island in terrible weather looking for seals. One of the boats disappeared, and the other boat with six men aboard managed to make it ashore. Sanford Miner, the captain of the Sarah W. Hunt, assumed all the whalers were lost, and sailed away to Lyttelton, New Zealand. Fortunately for the stranded whalers, a seal protection boat, the Kekeno, happened to arrive at the island, and rescued the castaways. The captain's behaviour caused an international scandal.

In the late 19th century, the island became a pastoral lease. Sheep farming was undertaken from 1896 until the lease, along with the sheep and a small herd of cattle, was abandoned in 1931 because of the Great Depression.

In 1907, a group of scientists spent eight days on the island group surveying. The 1907 Sub-Antarctic Islands Scientific Expedition conducted a magnetic survey and also took botanical, zoological and geological specimens.

During World War II, a coastwatching station was operative at Tucker Cove at the north shore of Perseverance Harbour as part of the Cape Expedition program.

Following the passage of the Ngai Tahu Claims Settlement Act 1998, the name of the island was officially altered to Campbell Island / Motu Ihupuku.

An amateur radio DXpedition organised by the Hellenic Amateur Radio Association of Australia visited Campbell Island during November–December 2012. The team consisted of ten amateur radio operators from around the world, a NZ Department of Conservation Officer and the ship's crew of six including the captain on the sailing vessel "Evohe". The ZL9HR DXpedition team made 42,922 on-air contacts during an eight-day operating period.

Weather station 
After World War II, the coast watching station at Tucker Cove were converted for use as a meteorological station until the summer of 1958, when a new base was established at Beeman Cove, a few hundred metres further east.  The new location provided improved exposure for the weather instruments, particularly wind recordings, and more modern accommodation for up to 12 full-time staff.

The new meteorological station (WMO ID 93944) at Beeman Cove was operated by the New Zealand Meteorological Service with ten full-time staff. Each team undertook 12-month expeditions to the island to undertake three hourly weather reports and twice daily radiosonde flights using hydrogen filled balloons. Weather reports were radioed back to New Zealand using HF radio to ZLW Wellington Radio. In addition to its primary purpose as a meteorological station, staff at the station also operated a seismic monitoring station, made measurements of the earth's magnetic field, the ionosphere, and aurora australis, and undertook Albatross banding and whale counts of primarily Southern Right Whales for the New Zealand Wildlife Service.

Fraser managed to return to shore with the assistance of one of his team, Jacinda Amey, after suffering severe lacerations to both his arms. This was the longest ever single-engine helicopter rescue in the world.
Jacinda Amey was awarded the New Zealand Cross—the highest bravery medal for civilians—for assisting the injured team member from the water. The rescue helicopter pilot, John Funnell, was awarded the New Zealand Bravery Medal.

In 1995, station staff were permanently withdrawn when the manual weather observation programme was replaced by an automated weather station, and the upper air soundings ceased. Today periodic visits to the island are undertaken by Meteorological Service staff to maintain the weather station on Royal New Zealand Navy vessels, which also transport conservation staff undertaking field research. Other visitors to the island include occasional summer time eco-tourism cruises.

In May 2018, scientists in New Zealand documented what they believe is the largest wave ever recorded in the Southern Hemisphere to date. The  wave was measured by a weather buoy near the island.

The legend of The Lady of the Heather
The Lady of the Heather is the title of a romantic novel by Will Lawson. The novel is a mixture of facts and fiction elaborating on the incidents surrounding Captain Hasselburg's death on Campbell Island. The story is about a daughter of Bonnie Prince Charlie, exiled to Campbell Island after she is suspected of treachery to the Jacobite cause.
Her character was inspired by Elizabeth Farr. Farr was probably what would now be called a "ship girl", but the presence of a European woman at this remote place, and her death, gave rise to The Lady of the Heather story.

The accident happened when William Tucker was present on the Aurora. Tucker was another unusual character in the sealing era who became the source of a legend and a novel. The remoteness and striking appearance of the sealing grounds, whether on mainland New Zealand or the subantarctic islands, and the sealing era's early place in Australasia's European history, supply the elements for romance and legend which are generally absent in the area's colonial history.

Climate
Campbell Island has a maritime tundra climate (Köppen ET). The island receives only 647 hours of bright sunshine annually and it can expect less than an hour's sunshine on 215 days (59%) of the year. The peaks of the island are frequently obscured by clouds. It is a windy place, with gusts of over  occurring on at least 100 days each year.

Flora and fauna

Important Bird Area
Campbell Island is the most important breeding area of the southern royal albatross. The island is part of the Campbell Island group Important Bird Area (IBA), identified as such by BirdLife International because of its significance as a breeding site for several species of seabirds as well as the endemic Campbell teal and Campbell snipe. Campbell Island also hosts numerous penguin species that breed on the island, including the yellow-eyed penguin, the rockhopper penguin, and the erect-crested penguin. Other albatross species breed on the island as well, such as the wandering albatross, the light-mantled sooty albatross, and both the Black-browed mollymawk and the grey-headed mollymawk. Other bird species that breed on the island include the sooty shearwater, the grey petrel, the white-chinned petrel, the endemic Campbell Island shag, the grey duck, the southern skua, the southern black-backed gull, the red-billed gull, the Antarctic tern, the song thrush, the Common blackbird, the Dunnock (Hedge sparrow), the New Zealand pipit, the white-eye, the lesser redpoll, the chaffinch, and the starling.

World's most remote tree
Campbell Island is home to what is believed to be the world's most remote tree – a solitary Sitka spruce, more than 100 years old. The tree is believed to have been introduced by Lord Ranfurly between 1901 and 1907. The tree has been proposed as a golden spike signal marker for the start of the anthropocene epoch.

Conservation
In 1954, the island was gazetted as a nature reserve. Feral Campbell Island cattle were eliminated by about 1984 and feral Campbell Island sheep were culled during the 1970s and 1980s, with their eventual extermination in 1992. In 2001, brown rats (Norway rats) were eradicated from the island nearly 200 years after their introduction. This was the world's largest rat eradication programme. The island's rat-free status was confirmed in 2003. Since the eradication, vegetation and invertebrates have been recovering, seabirds have been returning and the Campbell teal, the world's rarest duck, has been reintroduced. An undescribed Cyanoramphus parakeet was discovered (in fossil bones) in 2004, along with evidence of a falcon or harrier. Banded dotterel (Charadrius bicinctus) are also believed to have inhabited the island at one point. Other native landbirds include the New Zealand pipit and the Campbell snipe, a race of the Subantarctic snipe, Coenocorypha aucklandica, described race perseverance. It was discovered only in 1997 on a tiny rat-free island off the south coast, Jacqeumart Island. The snipe had survived there and began recolonising the main island after the rats had been removed.

Marine mammals have shown gradual recovery in the past decades. Sea lions and southern elephant seals have begun to re-colonize the island. Some southern right whales still come into bays in the winter to winter or calve most notably at Northwest Bay and Perseverance Harbour, but in much smaller number than in the Auckland Islands. Historically, fin whales used to inhabit close to shore.

The area is one of five subantarctic island groups designated as a World Heritage Site by UNESCO.

Geology 
Campbell Island is an extinct alkaline shield volcano that marine erosion has worn down into its present shape. The volcano has been extinct for some six million years and glacial ice cover prevented vegetation from growing on the island until approximately 15,000 years ago. Basalt, hawaiite, mugearite and trachyte are the dominant volcanic rocks comprising Campbell Island. They were erupted between 6.5 and 11 million years ago during the Miocene epoch. The island is considered to be part of the submerged continent of Zealandia.

Research
During World War II, the New Zealand government had coastal watchers on the island with trained naturalists who made observations of the geology, flora, and fauna of Campbell Island.

To mark the 200th anniversary of its discovery, the Campbell Island Bicentennial Expedition (CIBE) was undertaken from December 2010 to February 2011. The research expedition was the largest multidisciplinary expedition to the island in over 20 years, and aimed to document the island's human history, assess recovery of the island's flora and invertebrate fauna since the removal of sheep and the world's largest rat eradication programme, study the island's plentiful but little understood streams and characterise the unusual stream fauna, and reconstruct past environmental conditions and deduce long term climate change from tarn sediment cores.

The expedition was run by the 50 Degrees South Trust, a charitable organisation established to further research and education on New Zealand's Subantarctic Islands, and to support the preservation and management of these World Heritage ecosystems. The expedition and the programme outputs can be followed at the CIBE website.

Gallery

See also 

 Megaherbs
 Campbell teal
 Campbell Island group
 New Zealand subantarctic islands
 List of Antarctic and subantarctic islands
 List of islands
 Desert island
 Rat Island, where rats have also been eradicated

References

External links 

 Topographic map, Campbell Island, NZMS 272/3, Edition 1, 1986.
 Long description of Campbell Island and especially its history
 Landcare Research - Campbell Island
 Campbell Island Bicentennial Expedition
 Campbell Island Freshwater Invertebrate Identification Keys

 
Islands of the Campbell Islands
New Zealand subantarctic islands
Seabird colonies
Island restoration
Important Bird Areas of the Campbell Islands
Subantarctic islands
Seal hunting
Whaling stations in New Zealand
Volcanoes of the New Zealand outlying islands
Miocene shield volcanoes
Penguin colonies